Minuscule 406 (in the Gregory-Aland numbering), ε 130 (in Soden's numbering), is a Greek minuscule manuscript of the New Testament, on parchment. Palaeographically it has been assigned to the 11th century. 
It contains marginalia.

Description 

The codex contains the text of the four Gospels on 297 parchment leaves with some lacunae (Mark 4:41-5:14; Luke 3:16-4:4; John 20:3-21:25). The text is written in one column per page, in 18 lines per page.

There is also a division according to the smaller Ammonian Sections, but it does not contain references to the Eusebian Canons.

Lectionary markings were added at the margin by a later hand.

Text 

The Greek text of the codex is a representative of the Caesarean text-type. Hermann von Soden classified it to the Ια. Kurt Aland the Greek text of the codex did not place in any Category.

According to the Claremont Profile Method it represents textual family Kx in Luke 1 and Luke 20. In Luke 10 no profile was made.

History 

Wiedmann and J. G. J. Braun collated portions of the manuscript for Scholz (1794-1852). The manuscript was added to the list of New Testament manuscripts by Scholz.
C. R. Gregory saw it in 1886.

The manuscript is currently housed at the Biblioteca Marciana (Gr. I. 11) in Venice.

See also 

 List of New Testament minuscules
 Biblical manuscript
 Textual criticism

References

Further reading 

 J. Neville Birdsall, "406, A Neglected Witness to the Caesarean Text", in Studia evangelica, ed. K. Aland, F. L. Cross et al., T & U 73 (Berlin, 1959), pp. 732–736.

Greek New Testament minuscules
11th-century biblical manuscripts